The R641 road is a regional road in Cork, Ireland. It connects the N22 road to the N40 (Cork South Ring Road), via Wilton. The road was formerly part and known as the N71.

References

Regional roads in the Republic of Ireland
Roads in County Cork